Stephen Moorer (born September 29, 1961) is a stage actor, director, producer and non-profit administrator based on the Central California Coast. He founded the only year-round professional theatre in Monterey County, GroveMont Theatre in 1982, renaming the non-profit organization Pacific Repertory Theatre in 1994, when the group acquired the Golden Bough Playhouse in Carmel-by-the-Sea, California.

Early life and family
Moorer was born in Santa Monica, California.  His parents are George Edward Moorer, a retired salesman and entrepreneur, and Carrol Rothe Moorer, a nurse.  When he was 11 years old, his family moved to the Monterey Peninsula.  His mother acted in amateur performances in the San Fernando Valley, and Moorer got an early taste of performing in community theatre.  His first principal role was Miles in The Innocents (based on The Turn of the Screw), with The Rafters Theatre Guild.  Moorer attended the Carmel, California middle and high schools, becoming actively involved in the drama program, acting in and producing shows.  In his senior year, he played a criminal mastermind in Wait Until Dark.  From the age of 11 to 17, Moorer also studied theatre at Carmel's Children's Experimental Theatre.

After graduating from high school in 1979, Moorer appeared in a three-show repertory season at Hartnell Summer Theatre (which was later called the Western Stage).  He returned to the Children's Experimental Theatre in 1980 for a paid internship, sponsored by CETA, studying acting and theatre production.  In 1982, he trained in an intensive 16-week summer season at the American Conservatory Theater in San Francisco.

Moorer is married to Sarah Lapré of Carmel.  He was previously married to Jeanne Wooster, Mickie Mosley, and Julie Hughett, with whom he has one daughter, Claire.  He has two sisters, Jaqui Hope of Monterey, and Catherine Hudson of Carmel Valley.

Actor
Moorer's first professional acting experience was in 1979 at Hartnell Summer Theatre, playing Ottavio in Scapino.  The following year he played Bertram in All's Well that Ends Well and Benedick in Much Ado About Nothing.  He continued playing roles in companies throughout California, including Gunner in Misalliance (1981); Garth in Philadelphia Here I Come and Cliff in The Woolgatherer, Lancelot Gobbo in The Merchant of Venice and Tranio in Taming of the Shrew (all in 1982); Philip in The Lion in Winter and the title role in an adaptation of Tom Jones (both in 1983); Mark in Mass Appeal, Nick in David Mamet's The Woods and Toumel in A Flea in Her Ear (all in 1984); George in Of Mice and Men, John Merrick in The Elephant Man, Levinsky in Nuts, Dromio in Comedy of Errors and Romeo in Romeo and Juliet (all in 1985); Jack in Charley's Aunt (1986); and the title role in Robin Hood: The King Returns (1987) by Dan Gotch.

Beginning in 1987, Moorer began to perform mostly with the theatre company that he founded, GroveMont Theatre, later known as Pacific Repertory Theatre (PacRep).  His roles there in dramas, comedies and musicals included The Reporter in How I Got That Story (1987); Sylvestro in Scapino (1988); Williamson in Glengarry Glen Ross (1989); Valmont in Les Liaisons Dangereuses (1990); Barry Champlain in Talk Radio (1992); the title roles in Hamlet (1993) and Volpone (2000); Pilate in Jesus Christ Superstar; Johnny in Shimmer (1998); Brick in Cat on a Hot Tin Roof and Uncle Peck in How I Learned to Drive (both in 1999).

 
At the Forest Theater, for the Carmel Shake-speare Festival, he played Richmond in Richard III (1993), the title role in Coriolanus (1997), and Oberon in A Midsummer Night’s Dream (2000).  In 2002, he returned to PacRep, where he revisited the title role in The Elephant Man (2002, opposite Barbara Babcock).  Of this performance, one reviewer wrote, "Moorer reprises his 1988 role ... with skill and dignity.  Working with no makeup or prosthesis to simulate Merrick's appearance, Moorer twists his face into a grotesque mask from which a high-pitched, rasping, wheezing voice emerges. From a physical aspect alone, Moorer's performance is skilled and noteworthy.  Moorer also delivers a well-executed emotional performance that highlights Merrick's artistic sensitivity and droll sense of humor."  He next played Jason in Medea (2003) (directed by Joseph Chaikin).  His performances as Ned in Elizabeth Rex and Edward de Vere in The Beard of Avon (2005), were praised by the critic of the Monterey County Weekly as "two of the greatest performances I've seen during three years of reviewing plays on the Peninsula".

In 2007, he played the title role in Macbeth (2007)." In 2012, he appeared as Marc Antony in Shakespeare's Julius Caesar, in 2014, he portrayed Pontius Pilate in Jesus Christ Superstar, and in 2017 he played the title role in Cyrano at the Forest Theater. Monterey Herald critic Barbara Shuler noted that the "version fits Moorer well, allowing him plenty of knockabout comedy to enjoy alongside the deep dive into the pathos and suffering of this complex character. He does both with Cyrano-style panache and gives a heartrendingly moving performance in the final scene."

Director
Moorer has directed over a hundred productions. His first directing job was A Midsummer Night's Dream at the Monterey Bay TheatreFest in 1987.  At the Golden Bough Playhouse in Carmel, Moorer directed Pacific Repertory Theatre's (PacRep) inaugural production of Death of a Salesman (1995), as well as A Midsummer Night’s Dream (1987, 1994), Amadeus (1996), Henry IV, Parts 1 & 2 (2002), Henry V (2002), Passion (1997), Romeo & Juliet (1991, 1997), Antony & Cleopatra (1998), Cyrano (Wells adaptation) (1998), West Side Story (2001), Thomas of Woodstock (2001), and The Full Monty (2006, 2007).  

Moorer also directed PacRep's inaugural production at the Circle Theatre of the Golden Bough of La Bete (1995), as well as Sylvia (1998), Picasso at the Lapin Agile (2000), Edward III (2001), Richard II (2001), Sister Mary Ignatius Explains It All for You (2002), Henry VI Parts 1, 2 & 3 (2004), and Richard III (2004).  Of his Shakespeare "Royal Blood" series, Talkin' Broadway wrote, "Moorer ... has assembled a brilliant cast of actors from both San Francisco Bay and Los Angeles....  Moorer's direction is first class as he makes both productions exciting human dramas."  Another critic wrote, "director Stephen Moorer handles the time-shifting sequences with a keen immediacy that's become his trademark".

He directed the West Coast premieres of The Madness of King George (1995), High School Musical (2007), High School Musical 2 (2009) and Talking to Terrorists (2006).  At other theatres, he has directed The Wizard of Oz (2008), A Midsummer Night's Dream (2007), Othello (1992), King Lear (1999), Romeo and Juliet (1991), Nunsense (1991), Laughing Wild (1991), and The Merchant of Venice (1995), among others.

In 2003, Moorer produced and directed a Bay Area Critics' Awards-winning production of Buddy - The Buddy Holly Story. This production, starring Travis Poelle, opened at the Golden Bough Playhouse in Carmel and moved to San Jose, playing at the San Jose Stage.  The success of the production led to a revival in 2004 at the Post St. Theatre in San Francisco, garnering positive reviews and Bay Area Critics' awards for Best Musical, Best Ensemble, and Best Actor in a Musical (Travis Poelle).  Buddy Holly's widow, Maria Elena Holly, attended the show at each location, dancing onstage with the cast at curtain call. This production later returned to Carmel for several runs, most recently in 2008.

In 2009, Moorer directed Laughter on the 23rd Floor for Pacific Repertory Theatre.  The Monterey County Herald wrote, "Moorer has staged a terrific version of this play with a fun and talented cast". Between 2009 and 2016, Moorer directed a series of musical productions including "25th Annual Putnam County Spelling Bee", "All Shook Up", "Willy Wonka and the Chocolate Factory", "Poisoning Pigeons - A Tribute to Tom Lehrer", "Forbidden Broadway", "Hairspray", "Legally Blonde", "Spamalot", "Shrek the Musical", "The Pirates of Penzance", "Oliver!", and "Heathers The Musical".

In 2016, after a two-year renovation, the Forest Theater reopened with a season highlighted by The Wizard of Oz, produced and directed by Moorer. In 2017, Moorer directed and produced Peter Pan, also at the Forest Theater. This was followed in 2018 and 2019 by Fun Home at the Golden Bough and Beauty and the Beast at the Forest. Following the suspension of live performances due to the COVID-19 pandemic, Moorer reopened the Forest Theater in August 2021 by producing and directing a revival of Shrek the Musical.

Producer
Moorer began working in theatre production in 1981 as production manager for Carl Cherry Foundation's New Play Series.  By 2006, he had produced over 350 shows.  He founded GroveMont Theatre, now Pacific Repertory Theatre, in 1982, acting as Artistic Director, and based the company in the Monterey Playhouse.  Since that time, he has continued to lead the organization's activities as a major Monterey County arts institution and the only professional theatre company on the Monterey Peninsula.  In 1986, he oversaw the creation of the GroveMont Theatre Arts Center (now the Hoffman Street Theatre), and in 1990, he directed the renovation of the Monterey Playhouse.

In 1990, Moorer founded the Carmel Shake-speare Festival.  This annual summer festival uses all three of PacRep's stages, presenting a rotating repertory of Shakespeare, musicals, children's plays and other classic works of English-language drama.  Moorer also founded the Monterey Bay TheatreFest and the Actors-in-the-Adobes programs. He is also the co-founder of the Monterey County Theatre Alliance, a founding Board Member of Monterey Opera Association, the co-founder of Forest Theater Foundation, and a founding Board Member of Carmel Performing Arts Festival.

In 1993, Moorer spearheaded the campaign to save the Golden Bough Playhouse, and he has since directed its ongoing development and renovation.

In 2008, the Board of Directors of Pacific Repertory Theatre named Moorer as executive director. From 2008 through 2011, Moorer oversaw the Golden Bough Capital Campaign, resulting in a $2.5 million "Phase One" remodel project, designed by U.S. theatre architect Richard McCann, completed in October 2011. Phase One redesigned the main stage area of the primary Golden Bough Theatre, adding a digital projection system and two permanently installed revolving turntables. Additionally, the smaller Circle Theatre was rebuilt, electrical systems were upgraded, and safety and ADA access was improved. In 2017, Moorer announced plans for the "Phase Two" campaign, with a goal of $2.7 million, focusing primarily on the main auditorium and lobby areas.

In October 2018, Moorer announced a gift of $2.3 million from local philanthropies Roberta Bialek Elliot, which "essentially assures the completion of renovations" on PacRep's Golden Bough Playhouse."

Notes

References
"The Madness of Kings: A Small Company Takes on the Great Theatrical Tale of America's Last Royal Ruler", San Jose Mercury News, July 14, 1995, p. 39E
Clarkson, Philip B. "Carmel Shake-speare Festival", Shakespeare Companies and Festivals: An International Guide, pp. 28–31 (Eds. Ron Engle, Felicia Hardison Londré and Daniel J. Watermeier). Greenwood Publishing Group, 1995

External links
Moorer Profile at The Monterey County Theatre Alliance, Part 1
Moorer Profile at The Monterey County Theatre Alliance, Part 2
Review of Buddy
Pacific Repertory Theatre's official website

American theatre managers and producers
American theatre directors
American musical theatre directors
American male musical theatre actors
American male Shakespearean actors
American male stage actors
People from Carmel-by-the-Sea, California
Male actors from Santa Monica, California
Living people
1961 births
20th-century American male actors
21st-century American male actors